Macacine betaherpesvirus 8 (McHV-8) is a species of virus in the genus Cytomegalovirus, subfamily Betaherpesvirinae, family Herpesviridae, and order Herpesvirales.

References 

Betaherpesvirinae